TV Superstars is a party video game for the PlayStation 3, which uses the PlayStation Move motion controller. The game was developed by SCE Cambridge Studio and published by Sony Computer Entertainment. The game was released on October 26, 2010 in North America, October 29, 2010 in Europe and December 9, 2010 in Japan.

Gameplay

In the game players take the role of a Reality TV Show contestant who is on the hunt for fame and glory by winning a series of completely unrelated challenges on a Reality TV Show. The game utilises the PlayStation Eye to take a picture of the player which is then used to create an avatar which players use in the game. The game contains a series of party-style games which are part of a fake Reality TV Show.

Games include "Frock Star", a fashion show where players have to walk down a runway with as much style to win through trying out outlandish outfits and applying makeup to their avatars. Another game is "Let's Get Physical" which is a combination  of American Gladiators and Japanese Game Shows, players had to go through a series of mini-games such as running along a giant spinning wheel while dodging dangerous obstacles on the wheel as well as firing the avatar through the air to fit into a chalk outline printed on a wall. Other games include "Big Beat Kitchen" where players have to cook and rap in a Hip hop cooking show, "DIY Raw", a home make-over show which involves players attempting to prevent the house from collapsing and "STAA" (Superstars Television Acting Agency) where players have to film their own television commercials.

Game progress is measured by the popularity of the player's avatar which is increased mainly through media coverage where players are reported in tabloids after winning or losing a game, being involved in lucrative product endorsements which places the avatar's name and likeliness on game billboards and TV commercials.

Development
The game was unveiled at the 2010 Game Developers Conference in San Francisco. It was originally seen in a trademark filing by SCEA on 16 September 2009.

Reception
The game has received average reviews, with an overall score of 6.4 out of 10 from the GameRankings website and an overall rating of 6 out of 10 from IGN.

See also
Start the Party
Wii Party

References

External links
PlayStation.com entry

2010 video games
Guerrilla Cambridge games
Party video games
PlayStation Move-compatible games
PlayStation Move-only games
PlayStation 3 games
PlayStation 3-only games
Sony Interactive Entertainment games
Video games developed in the United Kingdom